Bălan  is a commune located in Sălaj County, Crișana, Romania. It is composed of five villages: Bălan, Chechiș, Chendrea, Gălpâia and Gâlgău Almaşului. It is situated on the river Almaș, a tributary of the Someș.

Sights 
 Wooden Church in Bălan Josani, built in the 17th century (1695), historic monument
 Wooden Church in Bălan Cricova, built in the 19th century (1848),   historic monument
 Wooden Church in Bălan, built in the 19th century, historic monument
 Grădina Zmeilor Natural Reserve (3 ha)

References

External links

Communes in Sălaj County
Localities in Crișana